was a song featured within the 1945 Japanese movie Soyokaze. It was written by poet and lyricist Hachiro Sato and composer Tadashi Manjome, who was also the producer of the film. The song was sung as a duet between the Japanese actress Michiko Namiki and the singer Noboru Kirishima and released on recording January 1946. It is considered the first hit song in Japan after World War II.

 was released on October 11, 1945, and was the first movie produced after World War II in Japan. It was a commercial success, but was severely criticized by movie critics. As autumn advanced, the song Ringo no Uta from the movie spread in popularity, becoming more famous than the film's theme song, Soyokaze. Ringo no Uta was broadcast on a radio for the first time on December 10, 1945, and the 78rpm record was released by Nippon Colombia in January 1946. Sato's lyrics expressed a girl's feeling in a red apple, one which matched the feelings of freedom after the war. The record recorded unprecedented sales which exceed 100,000 copies.

Background 
The history of Ringo no Uta has the twists and turns.
Soyokaze is a happy movie featured songs and love.
However, originally the film script was written in order to whip up Japanese people's fighting spirit in wartime.
Of course, Ringo no Uta was also made as a war song with the same intention, but did not pass the censorship by the then Japanese military authorities. 
Lyricist Hachiro Sato intended to write a bright military march, but the military authorities reached the conclusion that the song was too soft music under the wartime.
However, the situation changed completely when the war was over on August 15, 1945.
The plan to produce the first postwar film started just two weeks later in order to relieve and encourage the Japanese who were in poverty and suffered from the blow of defeat.
Soyokaze was chosen as the object of the plan and the production of Ringo no Uta was also resumed.

Composer Tadashi Manjome who was the producer of the movie Soyokaze discussed with Sato and changed words in wartime into the present words. 
Michiko Namiki was appointed as the leading role on Manjome and Sato's recommendation.
Manjome and Sato advised Namiki to sing more brightly, but Namiki could not readily bring herself to sing so because she lost her parents and elder brother and lover in war. She continued worrying about that for a while. 
But, it recorded the unprecedented hit as a hopeful song by her bright voice, and contributed greatly to the revival of the postwar Japanese culture.

References

External links 
 Michiko Namiki discography (Nippon Columbia)

1946 songs
Japanese-language songs
Japanese film songs